Information Retrieved, Pt. B  is an EP by indie rock band Pinback that was released as an exclusive 7" vinyl for Black Friday on November 25, 2011. It is limited to 1700 copies. It was the second installment of the "Information Retrieved" EP trilogy leading up to the release of Pinback's fifth studio album, Information Retrieved, which released in 2012.

Track listing
SIDE A
 "True North" - 3:54
SIDE B
 "CLOAD Q" - 4:03
 "untitled" - data track

References

2011 EPs
Pinback albums
Temporary Residence Limited albums